John Francis "Honey" Barnes (January 31, 1900 – June 18, 1981) was a Major League Baseball catcher. Barnes played for the New York Yankees in the  season. In one game, he did not get an at-bat, playing catcher. He batted left and threw right-handed. He was born in Fulton, New York and died in Lockport, New York.

Honey Barnes and Eppie Barnes were at Colgate University at the same time but are not listed as being related.

External links
Baseball Reference.com page

1900 births
1981 deaths
Baseball players from New York (state)
Colgate Raiders baseball players
New York Yankees players
People from Fulton, Oswego County, New York
People from Lockport, New York